Lagenanthus is a monotypic genus of flowering plants belonging to the family Gentianaceae. The only species is Lagenanthus princeps.

Its native range is Colombia to Venezuela.

References

Gentianaceae
Gentianaceae genera
Monotypic Gentianales genera